The eastern forest robin (Stiphrornis erythrothorax xanthogaster) is a subspecies of the forest robin found at low levels in forests from Cameroon and Gabon to DR Congo and Uganda. In 1999 it was recommended that it should be treated as a separate species instead of a subspecies. IUCN and some other authorities do not recognize the split, and consequently it has not been rated as species separate from S. erythrothorax. However, it has been described as frequent to locally abundant, and is therefore unlikely to qualify for a threatened category.

References

Stiphrornis
Birds described in 1883